The Pauper Children (Ireland) Act 1902 (2 Edw. VII c. 16) was an Act of Parliament of the Parliament of the United Kingdom, given the royal assent on 22 July 1902, and repealed in 1950.

It defined the terms "orphan child" and "deserted child" for the purpose of the Pauper Children (Ireland) Act 1898, in the cases of both legitimate and illegitimate children.

The Act was repealed in the United Kingdom, where it remained in force in Northern Ireland, by the Children and Young Persons (Northern Ireland) Act 1950.

References
The Public General Acts Passed in the Second Year of the Reign of His Majesty King Edward the Seventh. London: printed for His Majesty's Stationery Office. 1902.
Chronological table of the statutes; HMSO, London. 1993.

United Kingdom Acts of Parliament 1902
Repealed United Kingdom Acts of Parliament
Acts of the Parliament of the United Kingdom concerning Ireland
1902 in Ireland